Northside Historic District is a  national historic district located at Waterford in Saratoga County, New York.  The listing included 125 contributing buildings and one other contributing structure.  The district dates to 1828 and includes Greek Revival and Late Victorian architecture.

Notable residences include the Hugh White mansion and the William Mansfield home. Both are Greek Revival houses built about 1830. The Hugh White mansion serves as the Waterford Museum.

It was listed on the National Register of Historic Places in 1975.

References

Historic districts in Saratoga County, New York
Greek Revival houses in New York (state)
Victorian architecture in New York (state)
Historic districts on the National Register of Historic Places in New York (state)
National Register of Historic Places in Saratoga County, New York